The Smearing retransformation is used in regression analysis, after estimating the logarithm of a variable. Estimating the logarithm of a variable instead of the variable itself is a common technique to more closely approximate normality. In order to retransform the variable back to level from log, the Smearing retransformation is used. 

If the log-transformed variable y is normally distributed with mean 

 and variance  

then, the expected value of y is given by:

References

Regression analysis
Logarithms